Nolot is a surname. Notable people with the surname include:

 Benjamin Nolot (born 1976), American documentary filmmaker
 Jacques Nolot (born 1943), French actor, screenwriter, and film director